Croesus (French: Crésus) is a 1960 French comedy film directed by Jean Giono and starring Fernandel, Marcelle Ranson-Hervé and Rellys.

Cast
 Fernandel as Jules  
 Marcelle Ranson-Hervé as Fine  
 Rellys as Paul  
 René Génin as Burie  
 Miguel Gamy as Albert  
 Edouard Hemme as Le curé  
 Paul Préboist as Le maçon 
 Jeanne Pérez as Marie 
 Pierre Repp as L'employé de banque  
 Luce Dassas as Rose  
 Charles Bouillaud as Le premier gendarme 
 Jeanne Mars as La femme de Paul  
 Jacques Préboist as Un policier  
 Etienne Fleurichamp as Émile  
 Lucien Verva as Le Hébé  
 Olivier Hussenot as Un policier

References

Bibliography 
 Maurice Bessy & Raymond Chirat. Histoire du cinéma français: 1956-1960. Pygmalion, 1990.

External links 
 

1960 comedy films
French comedy films
1960 films
1960s French-language films
Works by Jean Giono
Films scored by Joseph Kosma
1960s French films